The Government College of Engineering, Adoor (CEA) is a college in Adoor, Pathanamthitta District, Kerala, India, located 3 km from the town centre at Manakala. It is affiliated with the APJ Abdul Kalam Technological University and is run under the aegis of the Institute of Human Resources Development, an institute of the government of Kerala. The College was inaugurated in 1995 by the Chief Minister of Kerala A K Antony. College of Engineering Adoor is recognized by the All India Council for Technical Education (AICTE). Recently the college has been selected in Technical Education Quality Improvement Programme (TEQIP) Phase II. It is one of the major engineering colleges in Pathanamthitta District and is one of the eight engineering colleges in the District.

Courses

The college offers BTech (Bachelor of Technology) and newly MTech (Master of Technology) degrees in four streams. 10% of the total seats are given to lateral entry students in every discipline. The number of seats per year is given in brackets.

 Computer Engineering (60+6)
 Electrical and Electronics Engineering (60+6)
 Electronics and Communication Engineering (60+6)
 Mechanical Engineering (120+12)

The college also offers MTech (Master of Technology) in below stream(s).
 Mechanical Engineering with specialization in Thermal Engineering (18)

Admission
Admissions are carried out on the basis of the ranks obtained in the All Kerala Common Entrance Examinations, conducted by the Controller of Entrance Examinations, Government of Kerala. The college follows a 50-50 method of admission from both merit and management streams. A significant number of students in the management stream is filled by children of NRIs.

When the college started in 1995, it had a 90-10 breakup of merit and management streams. However, the merit students were required to pay a refundable deposit (at the end of the course) of one hundred thousand rupees which was utilized for infrastructure development in the college.

College Senate

The members of the College Senate (College Union) are elected by and from the students of the college. The College Senate consists of elected representatives from each class and lady representatives from each year. The College Senate has an executive committee consisting of Chairman, Vice-Chairman, General Secretary, Treasurer, Editor, Sports Club Secretary and Arts Club Secretary. The tenure of office of the College Senate is one academic year.

Department associations

FORUM
FORUM (Fraternity of Royal United Mechanicals) is an association of the Mechanical Engineering students of CEA. They have organized many academic programs and In 2008 FORUM conducted PRAGNJA, an inter-college technical fest and exhibition.

PULSE
PULSE (Powerful and United Legion of Students of Electronics), is the Electronics and Communication Engineering students' association. They have organized induction program for freshers, introductory and expert seminars in recent technologies.

TRACE
TRACE (The Regal Association of Computer Engineers) is the association of Computer Science & Engineering students. Each year TRACE conducts a festival. TRACE introduced CEA to Linux by establishing the CEA-LUG (Linux Users Group).

EESA
EESA (Electrical Engineering student Association) is an association of Electrical and Electronics Engineering Students of CEA. EESA organizes social events, host talks by guest speakers and students, and helps communicate with the department and the students.

Clubs

Following clubs are present in college:

 Music Club
 Arts Club
 Sports Club
 Quiz Club
 Nature Club
 Drishti - Photography Club
 Dance Club

Technical and non-technical organizations

SAE 
SAEINDIA is a resource for mobility technology. As an individual member-driven society of mobility practitioners the ownership of SAEINDIA rests with its members who are individuals from the mobility community, which includes engineers, executives from industry, government officials, academics and students.

SAEINDIA is an affiliate society of SAE International registered in India as an Indian non-profit engineering and scientific society dedicated to the advancement of mobility industry in India.

Under SAEINDIA-CEA, CEA MOTORSPORTS was established and consist of mainly three teams: Team DRUTHA, Team ASTRA and Team AAGNEYA.

TEAM Drutha 
Team Drutha was initially formed in 2010 by a group of B.Tech students of College of Engineering Adoor, a government engineering college run by the IHRD. Its aims to compete in the SUPRA SAE.

Awards & Achievements
 Successfully passing the Virtual SUPRA SAEINDIA 2011, 2012
 Race a car in Buddh International Circuit, Noida, Delhi 2013
 Participated in SUPRA SAEINDIA 2016, at Buddh International Circuit, Noida, Delhi
 Participated and qualified for Endurance Race of SUPRA SAEINDIA 2017 at Buddh International Circuit, Noida, Delhi
 Secured 4th position in overall rankings at FFS India 2017, held at Kari Motor Speedway, Coimbatore
 Secured 2nd position in Skid-pad Event of FFS India 2017, held at Kari Motor Speedway, Coimbatore

TEAM Astra 
Team Astra was initially formed in 2016.Team Astra is a student-run design & manufacturing team of College of Engineering Adoor, that participate in various ATV competitions conducted across INDIA.

2017
2017   Mega ATV championship Defect in gearbox, vehicle couldn't run

2018
2018   ESI.[Endure Student India] Successful Participation with running condition
2018   Mega ATV Championship Overall 7th position with high performance of the vehicle
2018  Baja Sae India Virtual presentation Successful. 1st in Kerala, 58th in India among 305 teams

2019
2019   Baja Sae India Successful participation    
2nd Place in Acceleration
5th Place in Maneuverability
6th Place in Suspension
7th Place in Endurance race
7th Position Overall

TEAM Aagneya 
Team Aagneya, the official Go-Kart team of CEA was initially formed in 2017 by a group of B.Tech students of College of Engineering Adoor, a government engineering college run by the IHRD. This team aims to compete in FMAE FKDC, and GKDC.

Awards & Achievements
 FKDC 2018 - Successful participation.
              Acceleration First
              Endurance Third
              Overall Fourth
 BFKCT 2019 - Successful participation
 FKDC 2019 - Successful participation
              Design Third
              Overall Eighth

ASME 
The American Society of Mechanical Engineers (ASME) is a professional association that, in its own words, "promotes the art, science, and practice of multidisciplinary engineering and allied sciences around the globe" via "continuing education, training and professional development, codes and standards, research, conferences and publications, government relations, and other forms of outreach."

ISTE
International Society for Technology in Education (ISTE) is a nonprofit professional organization with a worldwide membership of leaders and potential leaders in educational technology. The ISTE student chapter at CEA organizes seminars, industrial visits, competitions, workshops and discussions. In 2002 ISTE student chapter at CEA won the best student chapter award in Kerala.

IEEE
The Institute of Electrical and Electronics Engineers or IEEE is an international professional organization for the advancement of technology related to electricity.  IEEE student branch was formed in CEA in 29 February 2000. The IEEE Student chapter at CEA imparts knowledge to the students by conducting industrial visits, paper presentations and circuit designs.

NSS
National Service Scheme (NSS) aims to integrate learning with social service. The students conduct activities such as blood donation, nature camp, and campus beautification.

Placement cell
The Placement cell functioning in the campus dedicates itself to help students establish their career. Companies are invited to the College to recruit final-year students. Students have received placements in MNCs like Infosys, HCL, Syntel, Larsen & Toubro, UST Global, CTS, Mindtree, Oracle, Tata Elxsi and Wipro, through the Placement cell.

Arts and sports

The arts and sports festivals conducted every year by the college senate. The College Senate divides students into four houses, each having a captain and a vice captain. Arts and Sports festivals are conducted in even semesters.

Technical events

AAROH
Aaroh is the annual national-level technical extravaganza of College of Engineering, Adoor. Driven by the motto "Rise High, Rise Bright", Aaroh aims at providing a platform for students to explore and showcase their technical skills against the best in the nation. Aaroh offers events including exhibition, seminars and workshops.

Location
CEA is located at Manakkala, 2.5 km away from the main Adoor Municipality on the sidelines of Adoor-Karunagappally road.  More than 50 buses ply along this route, providing easy access. The nearest railway stations are Karunagappally, Kayamkulam and Chengannur. The M.C. Road links it to Thiruvananthapuram International Airport and Kochi Airport.

Gallery

Controversies
On 19 August 2004, a 20 year old computer science graduate from the college named Rajani S. Anand committed suicide following her inability to pay hostel fee and reluctance from banks to give her student loan. This event led to resignation of then Chief minister of Kerala A. K. Antony.

See also
 Cochin University of Science and Technology
 Institute of Human Resources Development
 List of Engineering Colleges in Kerala
 Adoor
 Manakala

References

External links

 http://www.ceadoor.ihrd.ac.in/
  Alumni website
 Official Facebook Page

Engineering colleges in Kerala
Institute of Human Resources Development
Universities and colleges in Pathanamthitta district
Educational institutions established in 1995
1995 establishments in Kerala